Francisca Hernández, was a Spanish mystic.   

She was a spiritual leader of the Alumbrados among the Franciscan monks of Valladolid. Her visions were influenced by erotic elements. 

She was the subject of a heresy process by the Spanish Inquisition, lasting between 1530 and 1534.

References

16th-century Spanish people
16th-century Spanish women
People charged with heresy